The 2014–15 Segona Divisió was the 16th season of second-tier football in Andorra.

Regular stage

League table

Results

Promotion play–offs
At the conclusion of the regular season, four teams advanced to the promotion play-offs. Each team's regular season record was carried over to the play-off. Teams played each other twice.

Play-off results

Top scorers
As of 26 April 2015

References

External links
 

Segona Divisió seasons
Andorra
2014–15 in Andorran football